Pingasa aravensis is a moth of the family Geometridae first described by Louis Beethoven Prout in 1916. It is found on Bougainville Island of Papua New Guinea.

References

Pseudoterpnini
Endemic fauna of Papua New Guinea
Moths of Papua New Guinea
Natural history of Bougainville Island
Moths described in 1916
Taxa named by Louis Beethoven Prout